Amolita fessa, the feeble grass moth, is an owlet moth in the family Erebidae. The species was first described by Augustus Radcliffe Grote in 1874. It is found in North America.

The MONA or Hodges number for Amolita fessa is 9818.

References

Further reading

External links

 

Omopterini
Articles created by Qbugbot
Moths described in 1874